The men's shot put at the 2019 World Para Athletics Championships was held in Dubai in November 2019.

Medalists

Detailed results

F11

F12

F20

F32

F33

F34

F35

F36

F37

F38

F40

F41

F46

F53

F55

F57

F63

See also 
List of IPC world records in athletics

References 

shot put
2019 in men's athletics
Shot put at the World Para Athletics Championships